Johannes Mannov (born 1960, Copenhagen, Denmark) is a Danish baritone singer.

Personal
Mannov is an opera singer. Mannov is the son of Børge Christian Mannov, who is a PR consultant and founder of Mannov Consult, and Else Mannov.  He has been married since 1990 to Adrienne Mannov(née Sharp) with whom he has two children, Emil and Ella.

He studied singing with Aldo Baldin and Hans Hotter in Germany.

He currently lives and works in Copenhagen and Odense.

Singing
Mannov has performed internationally, including at the Royal Opera, London at Covent Garden and The Megaron Opera in Athens.

Teaching
Mannov was a guest professor at the UdK in Berlin. He currently teaches voice at the Danish National Academy of Music and has a professorship at the Hochschule für Musik in Nürnberg, Germany.

Discography
 Holger Danske (opera composed by F.L.Ae. Kunzen), on Dacapo records.

 Die Tageszeiten (Cantata by Georg Philipp Telemann) on Deutsche Harmonia Mundi

External links

Johannes Mannov. Calendar of performances
Naxos: Johannes Mannov
DaCapo Records: Johannes Mannov
Johannes Mannov Operabase
PlaybillArts: Photo Journal: Genoveva at Bard SummerScape. Johannes Mannov performed the part of Siegfried.

1960 births
Living people
Danish opera singers
Operatic baritones